
Thirteen ships of the Royal Navy have been named London, after the city of London.  Another has been named :
  was a 40-gun East Indiaman purchased in 1636 and listed until 1653
  was a 64-gun second-rate ship launched in 1656 and blown up in an accident in 1665
  was a 96-gun second-rate ship launched in 1666: she was partly destroyed by fire by the Dutch in the Medway in 1667, but the remains were rebuilt becoming the next HMS London
  was a 96-gun first-rate ship launched in 1670 to replace the previous ship of the same name: rebuilt in 1706 and 1721, and was broken up in 1747
  was a 16-gun brig launched in 1756 on Lake Ontario and captured by the French the same year
  was a 6-gun Herring buss (formerly the civilian fisheries vessel Holden), purchased in 1756 from the Society for the Free British Fishery and burnt to avoid capture in 1758
  was a 6-gun busse purchased in 1759 and in the records until 1764
  was a 90-gun second rate, launched in 1766 and broken up in 1811
 HMS London was to have been a 104-gun first rate: she was renamed  in 1827, launched in 1828, and sold in 1905
  was a 92-gun second rate launched in 1840: converted to screw propulsion in 1858 and rearmed to 72 guns, became a harbour storeship in 1874 and sold in 1884
  was the lead ship of the s launched in 1899, converted to a minelayer in 1918 and sold in 1920
  was a  heavy cruiser launched in 1927 and sold in 1950
  was a  guided missile destroyer launched in 1961 and transferred to Pakistan in 1982, where she was renamed Babur
  was a Type 22 frigate launched in 1984, sold to Romania in 2002 and renamed Regina Maria
  will be the name of one of the eight Type 26 frigates

Battle honours

Kentish Knock, 1652
Gabbard, 1653
Scheveningen, 1653
Lowestoft, 1665
Sole Bay, 1672
Schooneveld, 1673
Texel, 1675
Barfleur, 1692
Chesapeake, 1781
Groix, 1795
Copenhagen, 1801
Marengo, 1806
Crimea, 1854−55
Dardanelles, 1915
Atlantic, 1941
Arctic, 1941−43
East Indies, 1944−45
Kuwait, 1991

See also
 
 HM Hired armed ship

Citations

References

Royal Navy ship names